The Todd-n-Tyler Radio Empire is a morning radio talk show based out of Omaha, Nebraska. It features Mike Tyler and Todd Brandt. The show is syndicated in various cities across Nebraska, Kansas, and Idaho. It is currently the #1 rated radio morning program in the Omaha market.

Format
Humorous comments on current events, politics, popular culture, and life events.

History
Tyler and Brandt first teamed up at WSJW in Harrisburg, Pennsylvania, in February 1993. Previously, Tyler was hosting the afternoon show and Brandt was part of the "Starview Morning Show". The duo moved to KEZO-FM in Omaha in August 1993. It became the top-rated morning show in Omaha in 1995 and has maintained that spot with the 25-54 demographic. The show began syndication in November 2006. The show is carried by the following stations:

Cast
Mike Tyler. Hometown: Mechanicsburg, Pennsylvania. Attended Millersville University of Pennsylvania. Tyler did several radio jobs in the York/Harrisburg/Lancaster, Pennsylvania market, before moving on to Omaha.
Todd "Boogie" Brandt. Hometown: Rugby, North Dakota. Attended Moorhead State College (now Minnesota State University, Moorhead) and Tempe Normal School (now Arizona State University). Brandt had radio stints in his hometown, starting on the air as a high school freshman. He has worked in Fargo, North Dakota, Phoenix, Arizona, Spokane, Washington, Portland, Oregon, Louisville, Kentucky, Harrisburg, Pennsylvania, and Omaha, Nebraska.
Big Pussy (Producer). Hometown: Villisca, Iowa. As a child, he spent most of his childhood on a farm in the Iowan countryside, where he raised and nurtured all sorts of livestock (primarily goats) and enjoyed the 4H competitions. He moved to Omaha, Nebraska, where he attended school at the University of Nebraska-Omaha.
Nick Allen. Hometown: Omaha, Nebraska. Comedian and entry level pharmacy tech by trade, he is now 'full time' on the show since January 2020. He was previously known as 'Midweek Nick Allen' coming on the show, 'Midweek.' 
Previous Cast Members: 
Petey-Mac (Sports). Hometown: Omaha, Nebraska. Petey jumps in during the last two hours of the show. Besides specializing in sports stories, he comments on any topics the other hosts are discussing at the time. Was removed from the show during the holiday break of 2019-20 due to unknown reasons. 
Craig Evans (News Guy). Hometown: West Memphis, Arkansas. Unwanted by biological parents at birth. He was adopted by a preacher and his wife. Moved to Lincoln, Nebraska in his teens. Was removed from the show 6/6/2022 due to budget cuts.

Honors
Todd and Tyler were honored by the Omaha Press Club and inducted as the 106th face on the Barroom Floor on May 19, 2006 and were roasted at this event by Larry the Cable Guy.

Todd and Tyler were nominated for the 2006 Medium Market Personality of the Year NAB Marconi Radio Award.

The Nebraska Broadcasters Association Inducted  Todd Brandt and Mike Tyler (Todd-N-Tyler) into the NBA Hall of Fame in August 2021.

References

External links
 The Todd and Tyler Radio Empire website
 "Todd and Tyler Unauthorized" website

American talk radio programs